Jair Minors (born 31 May 1994) is a Bermudian footballer who plays for the Saint Louis Billikens and the Bermuda national football team.

Youth career
In 2012, Jair Minors began play for the Saint Louis Billikens of the Atlantic 10 Conference. Since his freshman year in 2012, Minors has appeared in 35 games and has scored four goals in those games as a forward. Jair is currently in his senior year for the Billikens. He has been a solid performer for the Billikens due to, "elite speed", according to coach Mike McGinty.

Club career
In 2010 and 2011, Minors played soccer for the Bermuda Hogges of the Premier Developmental League where he played mainly as a forward and midfielder.

International career
Minors has capped multiple times for youth Bermuda national teams, U17 and U20, dating back to 2011. In 2016, Minors made his international debut for the Bermuda national football team where he started and played 60 minutes in a 3-0 friendly loss to St. Kitts and Nevis national football team.

References

1994 births
Living people
Saint Louis Billikens men's soccer players
Bermuda Hogges F.C. players
USL League Two players
Association football forwards
Bermudian footballers
Bermudian expatriate footballers
Bermuda international footballers
Expatriate soccer players in the United States
Bermudian expatriate sportspeople in the United States